Giovanni may refer to:

 Giovanni (name), an Italian male given name and surname
 Giovanni (meteorology), a Web interface for users to analyze NASA's gridded data
 Don Giovanni, a 1787 opera by Wolfgang Amadeus Mozart, based on the legend of Don Juan
 Giovanni (Pokémon), boss of Team Rocket in the fictional world of Pokémon
 Giovanni (World of Darkness), a group of vampires in Vampire: The Masquerade/World of Darkness roleplay and video game
 "Giovanni", a song by Band-Maid from the 2021 album Unseen World
 Giovanni's Island, a 2014 Japanese anime drama film
 Giovanni's Room, a 1956 novel by James Baldwin
 Via Giovanni, places in Rome

See also

Geovani
Giovanni Battista
San Giovanni (disambiguation)
San Giovanni Battista (disambiguation)